The 1922 Tour de France was the 16th edition of Tour de France, one of cycling's Grand Tours. The Tour began in Paris with a flat stage on 25 June, and Stage 8 occurred on 9 July with a flat stage to Toulon. The race finished in Paris on 23 July.

Stage 1
25 June 1922 — Paris to Le Havre,

Stage 2
27 June 1922 — Le Havre to Cherbourg,

Stage 3
29 June 1922 — Cherbourg to Brest,

Stage 4
1 July 1922 — Brest to Les Sables-d'Olonne,

Stage 5
3 July 1922 — Les Sables-d'Olonne to Bayonne,

Stage 6
5 July 1922 — Bayonne to Luchon,

Stage 7
7 July 1922 — Luchon to Perpignan,

Stage 8
9 July 1922 — Perpignan to Toulon,

References

1922 Tour de France
Tour de France stages